Jorge Luis Ulibarri (born 8 October 1975) is a former Spanish freestyle swimmer who competed in the 2000 Summer Olympics.

References

1975 births
Living people
Spanish male freestyle swimmers
Olympic swimmers of Spain
Swimmers at the 2000 Summer Olympics